In the run up to the 2020 Israeli legislative election, various organisations carry out opinion polling to gauge voting intention in Israel during the term of the 22nd Knesset. This article lists the results of such polls.

The date range for these opinion polls is from the previous election, held on 17 September 2019, to the present day. The elections are to be held on 2 March 2020. No polls may be published from the end of the Friday before the election until the polling stations close on election day at 22:00.

Polls are listed in reverse chronological order, showing the most recent first and using the dates when the survey fieldwork was done, as opposed to the date of publication. Where the fieldwork dates are unknown, the date of publication is given instead. The highest figure in each polling survey is displayed with its background shaded in the leading party's colour. If a tie ensues, this is applied to the highest figures. When a poll has no information on a certain party, that party is instead marked by a dash (–).

Seat projections 
This section displays voting intention estimates referring to a hypothetical Knesset election. The figures listed are Knesset seat counts rather than percentages, unless otherwise stated.

Graphs 
This graph shows the polling trends from the 17 September 2019 Israeli legislative election until election day using 4-poll moving average. Scenario polls are not included here.

For parties not crossing the electoral threshold (currently 3.25%) in any given poll, the number of seats is calculated as a percentage of the 120 total seats.

Polls 
Poll results are listed in the table below. Parties that fall below the electoral threshold are denoted by the percentage of votes that they received (N%) rather than the number of seats they would have gotten.

Legend
 Gov. — Sum of the current government parties: Likud, Shas, United Torah Judaism (UTJ), and Yamina.

61 seats are required for a majority in the Knesset.

Note: The composition of the current government does not necessarily determine the exact makeup of the post-election government.

Scenarios 
Gideon Sa'ar founds a new party

Gideon Sa'ar leading Likud

Prime minister 
Due to the political deadlock which resulted after the previous election, Shas chairman and Interior Minister Aryeh Deri suggested direct elections for prime minister. Some opinion pollsters have asked voters which party leader they would prefer as prime minister. Their responses are given as percentages in the tables below.

Netanyahu vs Gantz

Sa'ar vs Gantz

Coalition 
Some opinion pollsters have asked voters which coalition they would prefer. The tables below list their responses as percentages.

Minority government backed by the Joint List

General

National unity government headed by Benjamin Netanyahu

National unity government headed by Benny Gantz

National unity government

Government headed by Benny Gantz

Notes

References

Opinion polling in Israel